Conservatory of Indonesian Musical Arts (SMKI; Indonesian: School of Performing Arts) is an arts university in Indonesia with several institutions. See:

See also
Institut Seni Indonesia (disambiguation)
STSI